Somharuthai Jaroensiri (born 15 November 1971) is a Thai retired badminton player. She competed in women's singles at the 1992 Summer Olympics in Barcelona, and at the 1996 Summer Olympics in Atlanta.

Career 
Jaroensiri competed in 1992 and 1996 Summer Olympics in the women's singles, with her best achievement at the Olympics was reaching in the quarterfinals in 1992, losing to eventual gold medalist, Susi Susanti, of Indonesia, 11–6, 11–1. She won bronze medals at the 1992 Asian Championships and 1993 World Cup. She participated in six consecutive Southeast Asian Games from 1987 to 1997, and helped the team win the silver medals, other than that, she won three medals in the women's singles event, a silver in 1995, and two bronzes in 1991 and 1993. She also competed at the 1990 and 1994 Asian Games.

Achievements

World Cup 
Women's singles

Asian Championships 
Women's singles

Asian Cup 
Women's singles

Southeast Asian Games 
Women's singles

World Junior Championships 
The Bimantara World Junior Championships was an international invitation badminton tournament for junior players. It was held in Jakarta, Indonesia from 1987 to 1991.

Girls' singles

Girls' doubles

IBF World Grand Prix 
The World Badminton Grand Prix was sanctioned by the International Badminton Federation from 1983 to 2006.

Women's singles

References

External links 
 

1971 births
Living people
Somharuthai Jaroensiri
Somharuthai Jaroensiri
Badminton players at the 1992 Summer Olympics
Badminton players at the 1996 Summer Olympics
Somharuthai Jaroensiri
Badminton players at the 1990 Asian Games
Badminton players at the 1994 Asian Games
Somharuthai Jaroensiri
Competitors at the 1987 Southeast Asian Games
Competitors at the 1989 Southeast Asian Games
Competitors at the 1991 Southeast Asian Games
Competitors at the 1993 Southeast Asian Games
Competitors at the 1995 Southeast Asian Games
Competitors at the 1997 Southeast Asian Games
Somharuthai Jaroensiri
Somharuthai Jaroensiri
Southeast Asian Games medalists in badminton
Somharuthai Jaroensiri
Somharuthai Jaroensiri